Compton College is a public community college in Compton, California. From 2006, when it lost its regional accreditation, to 2017, when it regained that accreditation, it operated as a part of El Camino College. Before and after the partnership with El Camino College, the college was operated by the Compton Community College District.

History

Compton Community College was established in 1927 as a component of the Compton Union High School District. From 1932 to 1949, it operated as a four-year junior college, incorporating the last two years of high school as well as the first two years of college.

The campus was devastated by the 1933 Long Beach earthquake, leaving two buildings standing. Nobody on campus was killed.

In the 1940s, several thousand Compton College students entered the armed forces, and during World War II the campus housed a military unit and a defense plant.

In 1950, voters approved a bond issue separating the college from the high school district. The new college campus was then constructed at the college's present site, 1111 East Artesia Boulevard. Classes began on the new campus in the fall of 1953.

In the 1960s, the composition of the student body changed dramatically from predominantly Caucasian to overwhelmingly African-American. As a result, it has sometimes been called "California’s historically black college."

In 1970, the Board of Trustees appointed the institution's first African-American President/Superintendent, Abel B. Sykes Jr. Highlights of his 14-year administration included the construction of the first two new campus buildings since 1952: the Jane Astredo Allied Health Building and the Abel B. Sykes Jr. Child Development Center (named after him in 1995).

The 1980s was a period of reduced funding and partial retrenchment for the institution, but by the early 1990s the college had once again stabilized. The second major demographic shift occurred in the 1990s, making the campus population 46% African-American and 46% Hispanic (3% White, Non-Hispanic; 3% APISA; 2% other).

In 1996 the Board appointed Ulis C. Williams as Interim President/Superintendent and in January 1997 made this appointment permanent.

Loss of accreditation

In 2004 the college began experiencing significant turmoil caused by a "corrupt board and financial insolvency". In May 2004, the state installed Arthur Tyler Jr. as Special Trustee to help the Compton Community College District achieve fiscal stability and integrity. In August, the State Chancellor issued another executive order (2004-02) authorizing the continuing authority of the Special Trustee to manage the college, and to suspend for up to a year the powers of the governing board of the college, or of any members of that board, and to exercise any powers or responsibilities or to take any official action with respect to the management of the college. Interim President/Superintendent Rita Cepeda was hired in February 2005 to assist with the recovery of the college.

The next year, the executive director of the Accrediting Commission for Community and Junior Colleges (ACCJC), Barbara Beno, informed the college of the commission's decision to terminate the college's accreditation. In July 2005, the State Chancellor assigned Jamillah Moore, Senior Vice Chancellor of the California Community Colleges system as the interim President/Superintendent and Charles Ratliff as the Special Trustee with the impending departure of both Cepeda and Tyler. The college began its appeal to the commission regarding the termination decision.

On March 1, 2006, a third Special Trustee, Thomas Henry, was assigned to the college district to continue the implementation of AB 61 and the development of AB 318 to keep the doors open for students. On June 30, 2006, Governor Arnold Schwarzenegger signed AB 318 (D-Dymally) into law, giving the college district a $30 million loan for recovery and the opportunity to partner with a college of good standing to offer accredited courses. The bill also gave the Fiscal Crisis and Management Assistance Team (FCMAT) the responsibilities to conduct a comprehensive assessment and to develop a recovery plan for the college to regain its accreditation.

Five months later, the Special Trustee approved the Memorandum of Understanding (MOU) with El Camino College District to solidify the partnerships between the two districts. Under this MOU, the campus became a center of El Camino College. The Office of the President/Superintendent was replaced by the Office of Provost/Chief Executive Officer (CEO). The center is officially established as the Compton Community Educational Center. At midnight, Compton Community College lost its accreditation. Shortly thereafter, the Compton Community Educational Center officially became part of El Camino College with Doris P. Givens serving as the Provost/CEO. Lawrence M. Cox became Provost/CEO from 2008 to 2010.

Accreditation regained
On June 7, 2017, Compton College was restored to full accreditation. This followed years of rebuilding under President Keith Curry, who was provost of the campus while it was partnered with El Camino College.

Campus
The  library on campus opened in 2014. Its opening was originally scheduled for 2007. At that time it had a cost of $25 million. The opening was delayed by almost seven years and with an additional $4 million spent due to violations in the building code. It was extensively renovated.

Safety
The Compton College Police Department is responsible for law enforcement and safety at the college. Its police officers are California peace officers and are authorized to exercise peace officer powers pursuant to applicable state law under Penal Code §830.1. The department is also responsible for publishing an annual crime report covering the previous three years as required by the Clery Act. The Compton Fire Department provides fire protection.

Notable alumni

 Billy Anderson, NFL player
 Memo Arzate, retired professional soccer player
 Don Bandy, football player, Washington Redskins
Justin Carter (born 1987), basketball player for Maccabi Kiryat Gat of the Israeli Premier League
 James Coburn, American actor
 Coolio, rapper
 Iva Toguri D'Aquino (1934), wrongly identified as Tokyo Rose
 Louella Daetweiler (1918–2004), All-American Girls Professional Baseball League player
 Snoop Dogg, rapper
Carl Earn (1921–2007), tennis player
 Jamaa Fanaka, filmmaker
 William Denby Hanna, cartoon film producer, co-founder of Hanna-Barbera Productions (now known as Cartoon Network Studios)
 Sim Iness, Olympic champion
 Cornelius Johnson, Olympic champion (1936, high jump)
 Don Klosterman, American professional football player and NFL executive
 Yuri Kochiyama, Japanese-American human rights activist
 John LoVetere, American football player
 Wayne Maunder, actor
 Hugh McElhenny, professional football player and NFL Hall of Fame member
 Billy G. Mills (born 1929), Los Angeles City Council member, 1963–74, Superior Court judge thereafter
 Tino Nuñez, professional soccer player
 Ed Peasley, American football player and coach
 Joe Perry, professional football player and (NFL) Hall of Fame member
 Carl Pohlad, owner of the Minnesota Twins
 Alvin "Pete" Rozelle, NFL commissioner
 Don Wilson, Major League Baseball player for the Houston Astros

References

External links
Official website

El Camino College
Compton, California
California Community Colleges
Educational institutions established in 1927
Two-year colleges in the United States
1927 establishments in California